Bertrand Van Effenterre (born 2 March 1946) is a French film director, screenwriter and producer. His film Tumultes was screened in the Un Certain Regard section at the 1990 Cannes Film Festival.

Filmography

References

External links

1946 births
Living people
French film directors
French male screenwriters
French screenwriters
French film producers
Writers from Paris